Oodes is a genus of ground beetles in the family Carabidae, found worldwide.

Species
These 48 species belong to the genus Oodes:

 Oodes amaroides Dejean, 1831  (North America)
 Oodes americanus Dejean, 1826  (North America)
 Oodes angustus Andrewes, 1940  (India)
 Oodes austrinus Andrewes, 1940  (India)
 Oodes basrensis Ali, 1967  (Iraq)
 Oodes bivittatus Andrewes, 1924  (Sri Lanka)
 Oodes bostockii Castelnau, 1867   (Australia)
 Oodes brevis Lindroth, 1957  (North America)
 Oodes caerulans Andrewes, 1940  (India)
 Oodes calvus Andrewes, 1940  (India)
 Oodes congoensis Burgeon, 1935  (Democratic Republic of the Congo)
 Oodes denisonensis Laporte, 1867  (Australia, Indonesia, New Guinea)
 Oodes desertus Motschulsky, 1858  (Palearctic)
 Oodes echigonus Habu & Baba, 1960  (China and Japan)
 Oodes fitzroyensis W.J.MacLeay, 1888  (Australia)
 Oodes fluvialis LeConte, 1863  (North America)
 Oodes froggatti W.J.MacLeay, 1888  (Australia)
 Oodes gracilis A. & G.B.Villa, 1833  (Palearctic)
 Oodes helopioides (Fabricius, 1792)  (Palearctic)
 Oodes impressus Chaudoir, 1882  (Australia)
 Oodes inornatus Laporte, 1867  (Australia)
 Oodes integer Semenov, 1889  (Russia)
 Oodes irakensis Andrewes, 1927  (Iran and Iraq)
 Oodes japonicus (Bates, 1873)  (China, Japan, Laos, and Vietnam)
 Oodes latior Csiki, 1931  (Australia)
 Oodes lenis Péringuey, 1896  (Namibia)
 Oodes melanodes Andrewes, 1938  (Indonesia)
 Oodes modestus Laporte, 1867  (Australia)
 Oodes monticola Andrewes, 1940  (India)
 Oodes nil Darlington, 1968  (Indonesia and New Guinea)
 Oodes oblongus Laporte, 1867  (Australia)
 Oodes palpalis Klug, 1853  (Mozambique and South Africa)
 Oodes par Darlington, 1968  (Indonesia and New Guinea)
 Oodes parallelus Say, 1830  (North America)
 Oodes paroensis Laporte, 1867  (Australia)
 Oodes parviceps Sloane, 1896  (Australia)
 Oodes rossi Darlington, 1968  (Indonesia and New Guinea)
 Oodes siccus Darlington, 1968  (Indonesia and New Guinea)
 Oodes sikkimensis Andrewes, 1940  (India)
 Oodes sulcicollis Habu, 1978  (Nepal)
 Oodes terrestris Darlington, 1971  (New Guinea)
 Oodes tokyoensis Habu, 1956  (Japan)
 Oodes trisulcatus Laporte, 1867  (Australia)
 Oodes walshae Louwerens, 1951  (Borneo and Indonesia)
 Oodes waterhousei Laporte, 1867  (Australia)
 Oodes wilsoni Darlington, 1968  (New Guinea)
 Oodes xanthochilus Andrewes, 1923  (India and Sri Lanka)
 † Oodes kachinensis Liu, 2014  (Burmese amber, Myanmar, Cenomanian)

References

External links

Oodes at Fauna Europaea
 

Licininae
Taxa named by Franco Andrea Bonelli